Kawana is an electoral district of the Legislative Assembly in the Australian state of Queensland. Based on the Sunshine Coast, the district has been held by both sides of politics over its short history.

Geography
A coastal urban electorate lying to the east of the Bruce Highway, Kawana includes the suburbs of Kawana Waters, Sippy Downs, Minyama, Buddina, Parrearra, Warana, Bokarina and Birtinya. It also includes Aroona, Little Mountain, Wurtulla and parts of Currimundi and Caloundra West, all of which were added to the district at the redistribution ahead of the 2009 state election.

Originally the district stretched further north and west to include the suburbs of Buderim, Mountain Creek and Tanawha. However, these parts were redistributed into the new district of Buderim by the aforementioned redistribution.

History
First created for the 2001 state election, Kawana essentially replaced the abolished district of Mooloolah. The sitting member for Mooloolah, Bruce Laming of the Liberal Party, contested the seat, but was defeated by Chris Cummins of the Labor Party, who subsequently retained the seat at the 2004 state election. Cummins became a minister in the government of Peter Beattie before losing his seat to Liberal Party candidate Steve Dickson at the 2006 state election. Dickson transferred to the new seat of Buderim at the 2009 state election and was succeeded by Liberal National candidate Jarrod Bleijie.

Members for Kawana

Election results

References

External links
 Map of the electoral district of Kawana, 2017, Electoral Commission of Queensland
 Electorate profile (Antony Green, ABC)

Kawana
Kawana Waters, Queensland
Sunshine Coast, Queensland